Paradise Valley is a census-designated place (CDP) in Humboldt County, Nevada, United States, near the Santa Rosa Ranger District of Humboldt National Forest. The town is located in a broad valley, with the Santa Rosa Range of mountains just to the northwest. At the 2010 census, the population of the CDP was 109.

History
A post office has been in operation at Paradise Valley since 1871.  According to tradition, in the 1860s a prospector declared "What a paradise!" upon seeing the valley, after having traveled through the surrounding arid territory.

Demographics

As of the census of 2010, there were 109 people, 51 households, and 35 families residing in the CDP. There were 92 housing units. The racial makeup of the CDP was 89.0% White, 1.8% Native American, 6.4% some other race, and 2.8% from two or more races. 18.3% of the population were Hispanic or Latino of any race.

Paradise Valley Folklife Project
The American Folklife Center of the U.S. Library of Congress conducted extensive ethnographic field research in Paradise Valley from 1978 to 1982. The Paradise Valley Folklife Project generated a multi-format resource collection documenting the history and culture of the area's ranching community. A team of fieldworkers from AFC documented the distinct ethnic groups in the area (Apache, Anglo, Basque, Chinese, German, Italian and Northern Paiute); the history of the region, including archaeological remains of a Chinese community, foodways, and oral traditions. The resulting material was subsequently packaged by the Library of Congress into a collection titled "Buckaroos in Paradise: Ranching Culture in Northern Nevada, 1945-1982". The collection includes 32 boxes of archival material including manuscripts, audio and video recordings, and several thousand photographic prints and negatives from the AFC project and additional historical archives dating back to 1870. The project was initiated by the American Folklife Center in cooperation with the Smithsonian Institution in 1978.

Education
Humboldt County School District serves the community.

The sole school in Paradise Valley is the Paradise Valley School, which serves Kindergarten through eighth grade.

Paradise Valley School had 27 students in the 1963-1964 school year.

In popular culture

Trapper and self-styled mountain man Claude Dallas eluded capture for 15 months after killing two Idaho Fish & Game wardens in Idaho, near Paradise Valley, in 1981. After conviction, he escaped from prison in 1986 and after almost a year was recaptured in Riverside, California.

Notable people

Hazel Bell Wines, educator and state legislator

References

Further reading
Prudic, D.E. and M.E. Herman. (1996). Ground-water flow and simulated effects of development in Paradise Valley, a basin tributary to the Humboldt River in Humboldt County, Nevada [U.S. Geological Survey Professional Paper 1409-F]. Washington, D.C.: U.S. Department of the Interior, U.S. Geological Survey.
Marshall, Howard and Richard E. Ahlborn. Buckaroos in Paradise: Cowboy Life in Northern Nevada [Bison Books/University of Nebraska Press, 1981, ]. Washington, D.C.: U.S. Library of Congress.

Census-designated places in Humboldt County, Nevada
Census-designated places in Nevada